D'Eriq King (born August 24, 1997) is an American football quarterback for the DC Defenders of the XFL. He played college football at the University of Houston before transferring to the University of Miami where he played quarterback.

Early years
King attended Manvel High School in Manvel, Texas. He began his sophomore year as the eighth-string quarterback, claiming the starting spot a few weeks after the first game. During his senior season, he broke the career Texas 6A passing touchdowns record of 117 set by Kyler Murray the year before. During his high school career he passed for over 10,000 yards and rushed for over 3,000, throwing for 140 touchdowns and rushing for 48. He originally committed to Texas Christian University (TCU) to play college football but changed to the University of Houston.

College career

Houston 
King entered his freshman year at Houston as a wide receiver after injuries plagued the receiving corps during fall camp. He played in 10 games and made four starts, recording 29 receptions for 228 yards and a touchdown.
 
He played quarterback and receiver as a sophomore in 2017. After leading a comeback win against South Florida, he took over as the starting quarterback for the final four games of the season. For the season, he completed 90 of 139 passes for 1,260 yards, seven touchdowns and two interceptions. He also added 379 rushing yards with eight touchdowns and had 29 receptions for 264 yards and two touchdowns as a receiver. King entered 2018 as Houston's starting quarterback.
 
His junior season was cut short when he suffered a non-contact knee injury in the eleventh game of the year. On the season, he passed for 2982 yards, 36 touchdowns and 6 interceptions. He also rushed for 14 touchdowns; Kyler Murray and Dwayne Haskins were the only quarterbacks with more total touchdowns that year.
 
King returned as starting quarterback for his senior season after recovering from the previous season's injury. However, after the team's first four games, King announced he was going to redshirt for the remainder of the 2019 season.

Miami 
On January 20, 2020, King announced his transfer to the University of Miami.
 
On Sept. 4, King threw for 179 yards and a touchdown in a 44-13 road loss to No. 1 Alabama at Atlanta's Mercedes-Benz Stadium to open the 2021 season.
 
King was named Arthur Ashe Jr. Sports Scholar by Diverse: Issues In Higher Education.

NIL venture 
On July 1, 2021, NCAA student-athletes were allowed to receive compensation for use of their name, image, and likeness (NIL) for the first time, and King was one of the first athletes to take advantage of the new rules, signing deals with College Hunks Hauling Junk and a few local businesses to the Miami area. He and Florida State quarterback McKenzie Milton became the co-founders and public faces of Dreamfield, a company specializing in booking live appearances for student-athletes. Dreamfield will also offer non-fungible tokens (NFTs), digital art works that cannot be duplicated and are purchased with cryptocurrency.

College statistics

Professional career

New England Patriots
King signed with the New England Patriots as an undrafted free agent on May 9, 2022. He was waived on May 16.

Carolina Panthers
On November 14, 2022, King signed with the Carolina Panthers practice squad. King was expected to be assigned to the DC Defenders of the XFL on November 15 before the signing occurred. He was released on November 22.

DC Defenders
On December 12, 2022, King was officially assigned to the DC Defenders of the XFL after being released by the Panthers.

Statistics

References

External links
Houston Cougars bio
 

 

1997 births
Living people
People from Brazoria County, Texas
Players of American football from Texas
Sportspeople from the Houston metropolitan area
American football quarterbacks
American football wide receivers
Houston Cougars football players
Miami Hurricanes football players
New England Patriots players
Carolina Panthers players
DC Defenders players